Juan Malo (11 February 1922 – 8 October 2005) was a Spanish sports shooter. He competed in the trap event at the 1960 Summer Olympics.

References

1922 births
2005 deaths
Spanish male sport shooters
Olympic shooters of Spain
Shooters at the 1960 Summer Olympics
People from Ribagorza
Sportspeople from the Province of Huesca
20th-century Spanish people